Single-use medical device reprocessing is the disinfection, cleaning, remanufacturing, testing, packaging and labeling, and sterilization among other steps, of a used, (or, in some cases, a device opened from its original packaging but unused), medical device to be put in service again. All reprocessed medical devices originally labeled for single use in the United States are subject to U.S. Food and Drug Administration (FDA) manufacturing requirements and must meet strict cleaning, functionality, and sterility specifications prior to use. Although first regulated in the U.S., the reprocessing of medical devices, particularly those that are labeled "Single Use Device" (SUDs), is a global practice with countries in Europe, Asia, Africa, and North America actively engaged in reprocessing.  Currently, approximately 2% of all SUDs on the U.S. market are eligible for reprocessing by a qualified commercial vendor.   Reprocessing industry estimates indicate the amount of revenue saved by hospitals that use reprocessed devices to be $471 million in 2018.  Over 8,800 hospitals and surgical centers use reprocessed devices, in the U.S., Canada, Israel, Europe and Japan, according to the Association of Medical Device Reprocessors.

History of reprocessing in the United States
The practice of reusing medical devices labeled for only one use began in hospitals in the late 1970s. After a thorough review by the U.S. FDA in 1999 and 2000, the agency released a guidance document for reprocessed SUDs that began regulating the sale of these reprocessed devices on the market, under the condition that third-party reprocessors would be treated as the manufacturer and would meet the same criteria as the original equipment manufacturers (OEMs) of the medical device. Following the implementation of FDA regulation, the U.S. Congress codified these standards and other requirements in the Medical Device User Fee Act of 2002.

The Single Use Label
When a manufacturer designs and develops a product, it determines the materials used and how the device is labeled. In the U.S., to market a device as "reusable", a manufacturer must provide increased data requirements and invest the resources necessary to demonstrate to FDA that the product can be safely reprocessed at the hospital level. Unlike reusable devices, single-use devices are not sold with instructions on how they can be properly cleaned and sterilized nor have they been validated or tested for exposure to cleaning or sterilization processes, including chemical exposure and heat.

Commonly reprocessed SUDs
Commonly reprocessed medical devices include lower-risk, U.S. FDA Class I non-invasive devices such as sequential compression sleeves, tourniquet cuffs, and pulse oximeter sensors, to medium-risk, FDA Class II minimally invasive surgical devices including Ear, Nose and Throat microdebriders and cautery electrodes, laparoscopic graspers, scissors, forceps, scalpels, orthopedic blades, bits, burs, external fixation clamps, bolts and components, and electrophysiological cardiac catheters. To date, the FDA has not approved for reprocessing any Class III, or higher risk, SUDs.

U.S. regulations for reprocessed SUDs
The Medical Device User Fee and Modernization Act of 2002 (MDUFMA), and Medical Device User Fee Stabilization Act of 2005 were signed into law on October 26, 2002, and August 1, 2005, respectively. All medical devices including reprocessed devices are subject to premarket review by the U.S. FDA, unless the agency has, by regulation, declared the device to be exempt from premarket requirements.  Unless exempt, the lower risk "Class I" and "Class II" devices, whether "original" or reprocessed, are required to have cleared premarket notification submissions ("510(k)s"). With regard to premarket review, reprocessors are subject to more stringent regulation by FDA than are OEMs because MDUFMA, require FDA to withdraw premarket notification exemptions for a significant number of previously exempt reprocessed devices, although "original" devices remain exempt from premarket review.
Reprocessors must also validate the cleaning and sterilization methods they seek to use in the reprocessing of a SUD, and include in their 510(k) submissions "validation data [...] regarding cleaning, sterilization, and functional performance" to show that the reprocessed device "will remain substantially equivalent [...] after the maximum number of times the device is reprocessed as intended". Both OEMs and reprocessors are subject to establishment registration and medical device listing; medical device reporting; medical device tracking;  reports of corrections and removals, the quality system regulation ("QSR"); and labeling requirements.

Safety and efficacy of reprocessed SUDs
The Food and Drug Administration (FDA) and the independent U.S. Government Accountability Office (GAO) have concluded that there is no evidence of harm to patients from FDA-regulated reprocessed SUDs. A 2008 GAO report found that of the over 320,000 adverse events filed with FDA between 2000 and 2006, only 65 adverse events "actually involved or were suspected to involve a reprocessed SUD and that the reprocessed SUD was one of several possible causal factors in the adverse event. In reviewing these 65 reports, FDA found that the types of adverse events reported to be associated with the use of reprocessed SUDs were the same types of events that were reported for new devices".  The 2008 GAO report concluded: "After reviewing the available evidence – including FDA's process for identifying and investigating device-related adverse events reported to involve reprocessed SUDs, peer-reviewed studies published since 2000, and the results of our and FDA's consultations with hospital representatives – we found no reason to question FDA's analysis indicating that no causative link has been established between reported injuries or deaths and reprocessed SUDs".  In a separate letter from FDA to Congressman Tom Davis and Harry Waxman dated January 23, 2006, FDA indicated that a total of 65,325 reports have been filed between 2003 and 2006 for the malfunction or injury associated with the first use of devices labeled for "single use". The same search produced 176 cases of apparent malfunction or injury associated with reprocessed devices. Upon analysis of the latter reports, FDA determined that these adverse events were not related to the reprocessing of the "single use" device.

Studies have shown, however, that some single use devices are not conducive to the initial cleaning required to achieve sterility via validated methods.  

https://pubmed.ncbi.nlm.nih.gov/32909208/

It should also be noted that reprocessing companies attempted to bury this study due to the fact that the devices were obviously coated in human blood.

Benefits of reprocessing

Economic
FDA-regulated reprocessed devices cost between 40% and 60% of an original device.  Currently, reprocessors estimate that a typical 200-bed hospital, if taking advantage of a reprocessor's full product line, can save between $600,000 and $1 million a year and divert between 5,000 and 15,000 pounds of waste from landfills. According to a study by The Commonwealth Fund with funding from the Robert Wood Johnson Foundation and Health Care Without Harm in November 2012, they estimated that from hospitals implementing a reprocessing program, cost savings over five years was about $57 per procedure, and that if hospitals nationwide adopted an SUD reprocessing intervention, cost savings would be $540 million annually, or $2.7 billion over five years.

Environmental
Regulated medical waste (RMW), or "red bag waste", is a waste expenditure that typically costs hospitals 6 to 10 times more to dispose of than regular solid waste.  Among the inventory of devices reprocessed annually, ninety-five percent (95%) are recycled at the end of their life cycle rather than sent to landfills. A variety of otherwise reprocessable raw materials that end up in a hospital's RMW include stainless steel, aluminum, titanium, gold, polycarbonate and polyurethane. Reprocessing has allowed some hospitals to divert over 8,000 pounds of RMW from landfills each year, while larger systems can divert more than 50,000 pounds.

Physician and Clinical Statements in Support
American College of Cardiology (ACC) (1999)
Association for Healthcare Resource and Materials Management (AHRMM) Reprocessing Advisory
American Hospital Association (AHA) (2000)
American Medical Association (AMA), Report of the Council on Scientific Affairs (I-00) (2000)
American Nursing Association (ANA), (2010)
Association of periOperative Registered Nurses (AORN), Environmental Responsibility (2006)
Practice Greenhealth
The Mayo Clinic (with AAOS and AHA), August 2, 2001

List of Known Regulated Third-Party SUD Reprocessing Vendors

The Association of Medical Device Reprocessors (AMDR), based in Washington, D.C., is the global trade association consisting of members of the regulated, commercial single-use medical device reprocessing and remanufacturing industry. AMDR was founded in 1997 and the commercial single-use medical device reprocessors in the association now serve a majority of U.S. hospitals, including all the country's Honor Roll hospitals, as ranked by U.S. News & World Report.

International Regulation of "Single-Use" Medical Device Reprocessing
The reprocessing of SUDs is commonplace worldwide. Even in developed nations, including those that have reprocessing prohibitions in place, hospitals routinely reuse SUDs in an unregulated manner. In many cases (particularly in Africa and Asia), uncontrolled reuse of such devices is relatively common, if not the norm.

European Union

Currently, the European Union (EU) does not have a single policy regarding the reprocessing of SUDs.  However, it is in the process of revising its Medical Device Directive.  In 1993, at the issuance of the last Medical Device Directive, the issue of medical device reprocessing was identified as in need of additional clarification and the European Commission was instructed to submit a report on the issue by 2010. In August, 2010, the Commission released its report, highlighting the risks of unregulated reprocessing.  Ultimately, the European Commission released its proposal  and the European Parliament approved its draft  (9 October 2013).  Both legislative versions propose to regulate reprocessing as manufacturing.  The European Council is now set to approve its own version of the legislation.  Ultimately, both the Council and Parliament will have to agree, meeting in Trialogue with the European Commission, on the final version of the legislation.  It is hoped the final agreement on the regulation will completed in 2015.

Until then, regulation of reprocessing activities is left to the individual Member States.  Since 2001, Germany has had in place a regulatory framework that does not distinguish between the reprocessing of "reusable" and so-called "single-use" medical devices.  The guidelines, therefore, allow for SUD reprocessing if conformance with certain standards is achieved.  The German Medical Devices Law and the Medical Devices Operator Ordinance regulate the reprocessing of medical devices and in doing so refer to the mutual recommendation by the Robert Koch Institute (RKI) and the Federal Institute for Drugs and Medical Devices (BfArM) for the reprocessing of medical devices. As a result, the RKI's requirements must be observed.

Institutions, which want to reprocess single-use medical devices, must adopt and implement a quality management system according to DIN EN ISO 13485:2007. Compliance with the quality management requirements is monitored annually by "Notified Bodies" that have been accredited by the Central Authority of the Länder for Health Protection with regard to Medicinal Products and Medical Devices (ZLG).

Other Member States, such as the United Kingdom, Spain and France,  discourage or prohibit SUD reprocessing.  The majority of Member States in Europe do not have any national regulations regarding reprocessing.

Africa and the Middle East

The lack of resources, including medical devices and distribution channels, "necessitates the reuse of single-use devices" in much of Africa. This includes the reuse of syringes and needles that have not been sterilized, and even rubber gloves. In the Middle East, available data indicates that reuse of SUDs is common throughout Arab countries (particularly for cardiac catheters), despite the absence of a regulatory framework. Reprocessing in both Africa and the Middle East is done at the user-facility level.

Israel

Israel does not have regulations in place specific to the reprocessing of SUDs, but as a general matter, medical devices must be registered with the Ministry of Health (MOH) before they can be sold in the country. If a product is approved by the U.S. FDA, it will generally be registered by the MOH with no further testing requirements and, therefore, may be lawfully marketed in the country. Consistent with this policy, FDA-cleared reprocessed devices have been registered with MOH and are actively imported into the country.

Asia/Japan

The reuse of SUDs in much of Asia is common, particularly for injection needles. For the most part, there are no national regulations governing reuse of SUDs and, thus, third-party reprocessors do not offer their services in Asia. Rather, most reuse in Asia is conducted in an unregulated-manner at the user-facility level. Reprocessing is not currently regulated in Japan, but, available data indicates that the reuse of SUDs is relatively common. A 2003 survey found that 80 to 90 percent of hospitals reused SUDs.

Australia

Australia enacted regulations regarding the reprocessing ("remanufacturing" in Australia) of SUDs in 2003. Similar to the U.S., in Australia, all reprocessors (third-party, hospital, and OEM) must conform to medical device manufacturer requirements as regulated by the Therapeutic Goods Administration (TGA). Prior to implementation of these requirements, hospital reprocessing of SUDs was common.

Canada

Health Canada does not currently regulate reprocessed single-use devices or the third-party companies that are reprocessing these devices for Canadian hospitals.  Whether or not to reprocess a single-use device is determined by the territorial and provincial health ministries as well as hospital boards. A number of provinces have adopted similar positions that allow for the reprocessing of SUDs if the third party reprocessor is regulated by the FDA.

British Columbia

British Columbia issued a policy to its health authorities stating that by January 1, 2008, all health authorities must have eliminated the reprocessing and reuse of critical contact SUDs, unless they have been reprocessed by a licensed third-party reprocessor that is certified by a national regulatory authority such as Health Canada or the U.S. Food and Drug Administration.  The policy was revised in 2011 with additional information that sharps (e.g. scalpel blades, drill bits, saw blades, shavers) and needles shall be single-use and shall not be reprocessed.

Manitoba

Manitoba does not permit hospitals to reuse SUDs in-house, but does permit hospitals to contract with an FDA regulated vendor, among other requirements.

Alberta
Alberta Health Services issued a policy in 2012 prohibiting the reuse and reprocessing of both critical and semi-critical single-use medical devices.

Northwest Territories
Since 2005, the Northwest Territories have prohibited reprocessing. Specifically, the Northwest Territories Department of Health and Social Services revised its Hospital and Health Care Facility Standards Regulations to require that "a disposable device intended to be used on a patient during a single procedure shall not be used on a patient for more than one procedure and shall not be used on another patient".

Ontario

In 2006, the Ontario Ministry of Health and Long Term Care endorsed a guidance document developed by its Provincial Infectious Diseases Advisory Committee (PIDAC) advising that critical and semi-critical SUDs must not be reprocessed and reused, unless the reprocessing is done by a licensed reprocessor.

Saskatchewan

In 2013, The Saskatchewan Ministry of Health affirmed a policy outlining requirements for hospitals that reprocess SUDs. Consistent with the policies of other provinces, Saskatchewan requires, among other things, that hospitals outsource to an FDA regulated vendor.

References

Medical devices